Zanzibar City or Mjini District, often simply referred to as Zanzibar (Wilaya ya Zanzibar Mjini or Jiji la Zanzibar in Swahili) is one of two administrative districts of Mjini Magharibi Region in Tanzania. The district is comparable in size to the land area of Nauru. The district has a water border to the west by the Indian Ocean. The district is bordered to the east by Magharibi District. The district seat is located in Stonetown. The city is largest city on the island of Zanzibar. It is located on the west coast of Unguja, the main island of the Zanzibar Archipelago, north of the much larger city of Dar es Salaam across the Zanzibar Channel. The city also serves as the capital of the Zanzibar Urban/West Region. In 2012 its population was 223,033.

Zanzibar City comprises two main parts, Stone Town and Ng'ambo (literally: "The Other Side"); the two areas are historically divided by a creek, now marked by a large street called Creek Road. Stone Town is the historical core of the city, former capital of the Zanzibar Sultanate; because of its unique architecture and culture, it was declared a UNESCO World Heritage Site in 2000. Ng'ambo is a much larger, modern area that developed around Stone Town after the Zanzibar Revolution, with office buildings and large apartment blocks such as those of the Michenzani neighbourhood. Zanzibar City is served by a number of international and domestic airlines via Abeid Amani Karume International Airport.

History

In 1592, the first English ship arrived in port. In 1824, Said bin Sultan, Sultan of Muscat and Oman established the capital of his kingdom in the city. The city was a high place of slavery, one of the main ports of East Africa for the slave trade. In 1846, the island had 360,000 enslaved for 450,000 inhabitants. In 1866, the British explorer David Livingstone (1813–1873) stayed in Zanzibar to prepare his last expedition to Tanzania. In 1892, Zanzibar was declared a free port.

Climate
Zanzibar City has a tropical climate, very similar to whole Unguja island, and slightly hotter than what is found in Pemba. This climate is classified as a tropical monsoon climate (Köppen climate classification Am). There are two rain seasons, with most rainfall coming between March and May and smaller rain season coming between November and December. Drier months are January - February, and a longer drier season between June and October.

Places of worship 
The places of worship in the city are predominantly Muslim mosques. There are also Christian churches and temples: Roman Catholic Diocese of Zanzibar (Catholic Church), Anglican Church of Tanzania (Anglican Communion), Evangelical Lutheran Church in Tanzania (Lutheran World Federation), Baptist Convention of Tanzania (Baptist World Alliance), Assemblies of God.

Constituencies

For parliamentary elections, Tanzania is divided into constituencies. As of the 2010 elections the area for Zanzibar City District had ten of the nineteen constituencies in the region:
 Amani Constituency
 Chumbuni Constituency
 Jangombe Constituency
 Kikwajuni Constituency
 Kwahani Constituency
 Kwamtipura Constituency
 Magomeni Constituency
 Mji Mkongwe Constituency
 Mpendae Constituency
 Rahaleo Constituency

Wards

The Zanzibar Urban District is administratively divided into 45 wards:

As of 2012, Mjini District was administratively divided into 20 wards.

Wards

 Amani
 Chumbuni
 Jang'ombe
 Kikwajuni
 Kilimahewa
 Kwaalinathoo
 Kwahani
 Kwamtipura
 Magomeni

 Makadara
 Mchangani
 Meya
 Miembeni
 Mkele
 Mkunazini
 Mpandae
 Muungano
 Mwembe Makumbi
 Nyerere
 Rahaleo

Demographics

Twin towns - sister cities

Hamburg is twinned with:
 Potsdam, Germany (2017)

See also
 Timeline of Zanzibar City
 2008 Zanzibar power blackout
 Stone Town
 Michenzani
 Zanzibar University

References

Bibliography

External links

 

 
Capitals of former nations
Cities in Zanzibar
Districts of Mjini Magharibi Region
Populated coastal places in Zanzibar
Port cities in Tanzania